Pierre Hostein (born 2 May 1888, date of death unknown) was a French cyclist. He competed in two events at the 1908 Summer Olympics.

References

External links
 

1888 births
Year of death missing
French male cyclists
Olympic cyclists of France
Cyclists at the 1908 Summer Olympics
Sportspeople from Gironde
Cyclists from Nouvelle-Aquitaine